Jorge López Malo (born 14 August 1957) is a Mexican former footballer. He competed in the men's tournament at the 1976 Summer Olympics.

References

External links
 

1957 births
Living people
Mexican footballers
Mexico international footballers
Olympic footballers of Mexico
Footballers at the 1976 Summer Olympics
Place of birth missing (living people)
Association football defenders